Malplaquet is the name of two places in Belgium and a place in France:
Malplaquet, Liège at 
Malplaquet, Hainaut at 
Malplaquet (France) in which the Battle of Malplaquet was fought
The Battle of Malplaquet (11 September 1709) between the French and the Allies, the largest 18th-century European battle
Malplaquet Palace, a fictional estate in Northamptonshire, England, in the 1946 novel Mistress Masham's Repose